Seguenzioidea is a superfamily of minute to medium-sized sea snails, marine gastropod mollusks in the clade Vetigastropoda.

Description

The distinctive characteristics of the shells of the Seguenzioidea are: 
 the nacreous layer (a plesiomorphic character, i.e. a character state that a taxon is inferred to have been retained from its ancestors) This occurs also in the following families: Pleurotomariidae, Haliotidae, Turbinidae, Trochidae, and possibly in the Skeneidae.
 the protoconch has a trochoid shape.
 usually with one or more labral sinuses. This character is also found is several other superfamilies such as Neomphaloidea, Pleurotomarioidea, Fissurelloidea, and Scissurelloidea and in the families Siliquariidae and Turridae. Therefore, this characteristic is to be considered autapomorphic.
 a unique radular formula with an underlying rhipidoglossate ground plan.

Taxonomy 
This superfamily was placed in part or in whole previously to 1979 either in the Archaeogastropoda near the superfamily Trochoidea or in the Caenogastropoda near the superfamily Stromboidea. In 1987 Salvini-Plawén and Haszprunar changed its status to the suborder Seguenziina, based on the radular formula that they considered to be intermediate between  "rhipidoglossate" and "taenioglossate". At about the same time in 1987 Goryachev elevated the superfamily to ordinal status Seguenziiformes in the superorder Littorinimorpha, based on the taenioglossal radula.

2005 taxonomy 
2005 taxonomy according to Bouchet & Rocroi, 2005. (Families that are exclusively fossil are indicated with a dagger †.)
Superfamily Seguenzioidea
Family Seguenziidae
Family Chilodontaidae
† Family Eucyclidae
† Family Laubellidae

2007–2009 taxonomy 
Kano et al. (2009) elevated the subfamily Calliotropinae to the family level as the Calliotropidae, and the subfamily Cataeginae to family level as the Cataegidae.

The superfamily Seguenzioidea consists of six families:

 Cataegidae McLean & Quinn, 1987
 Chilodontaidae Wenz, 1938
 Choristellidae Bouchet & Warén, 1979
 Eucyclidae Koken, 1896
 † Eucycloscalidae Gründel, 2007 
  Eudaroniidae Gründel, 2004
 † Eunemopsidae Bandel, 2010 
 † Lanascalidae Bandel, 1992 
†  Laubellidae Cox, 1960 
  Pendromidae Warén, 1991
 † Pseudoturcicidae Bandel, 2010 
 † Sabrinellidae Bandel, 2010 
 Seguenziidae Verrill, 1884
 Trochaclididae Thiele, 1928
Unassigned to a family
 Adeuomphalus Seguenza, 1876 
 Aequispirella Finlay, 1924
 Akritogyra Warén, 1992
 Anekes Bouchet & Warén, 1979
 Benthobrookula A. H. Clarke, 1961
Brookula Iredale, 1912
Eudaronia Cotton, 1945
 Granigyra Dall, 1889
 Lissotesta Iredale, 1915
 Lissotestella Powell, 1946
 Microcarina Laseron, 1954
Moelleriopsis Bush, 1897
 Notosetia Iredale, 1915
 Palazzia Warén, 1991
 Putilla A. Adams, 1867
 Retigyra Warén, 1989
 Trenchia Knudsen, 1964
 Ventsia Warén & Bouchet, 1993
 Vetulonia Dall, 1913
 Wanganella Laseron, 1954
 Xyloskenea B. A. Marshall, 1988
Unassigned genera brought into synonymy
 Abyssogyra A.H. Clarke, 1961: synonym of Moelleriopsis Bush, 1897
 Intortia Egorova, 1972: synonym of Lissotesta Iredale, 1915
 Molleriopsis : synonym of Moelleriopsis Bush, 1897

References 

 Kano, Y. 2008: Vetigastropod phylogeny and a new concept of Seguenzioidea: Independent evolution of copulatory organs in the deep-sea habitats. Zoologica Scripta 37: 1-21
 James F. Quinn Jr., (1991), Systematic Position of Basilissopsis and Guttula, and a Discussion of the Phylogeny of the Seguenzioidea (Gastropoda: Prosobranchia),  Bulletin of Marine Science, Volume 49, Numbers 1-2, September 1991 , pp. 575-598(24)

 
Vetigastropoda